General Sir John Stephen Cowans,  (11 March 1862 – 16 April 1921) was a senior British Army officer who served as Quartermaster-General to the Forces from 1912 to 1919, covering the period of the First World War.

Military career
Educated at Burney's Academy at Gosport, Cowans was commissioned into the Rifle Brigade in 1881.

He became a Deputy Assistant Quartermaster General at Army Headquarters in 1898, and received the brevet rank of lieutenant-colonel on 28 March 1900. In this position, he was involved in organizing troops during the Coronation of King Edward VII and Queen Alexandra. For this service he was invested as a Member (fourth class) of the Royal Victorian Order (MVO) two days after the ceremony, on 11 August 1902. The following year, he became Assistant Quartermaster-General for 2nd Division at Aldershot Command in 1903. In 1906 he was appointed Director-General of Military Education for the Indian Army and in 1907 he became Director of Staff Duties and Training at Army Headquarters in India. He then became Commander of the Presidency Brigade in Calcutta in 1908.

He returned to the United Kingdom in 1910 to be Director-General of the Territorial Forces and then became Quartermaster-General to the Forces in 1912; in this capacity he was responsible for finding accommodation and supplies for more than a million newly enlisted servicemen at the start of the First World War and worked closely with the Women's Legion and the YMCA to achieve this.

Prime Minister H. H. Asquith described Cowans as "the best Quartermaster since Moses". As a measure of his competence Cowans was the only member of the Army Council to retain his position throughout the entire war.

In October 1919, Cowans was appointed a Grand Cross of the Order of the Redeemer by Alexander of Greece, King of the Hellenes; this is the highest grade of the highest order of Greece. He retired that year.

Family
In 1884, he married Eva Mary Coulson: they had no children.

Death
He died at Menton, France, in April 1921 aged 59, and was buried at St Mary's Roman Catholic Cemetery, Kensal Green, London.

References

 

|-

1862 births
British Army generals
1921 deaths
Military personnel from Cumberland
Knights Grand Cross of the Order of the Bath
Knights Grand Cross of the Order of St Michael and St George
Members of the Royal Victorian Order
Rifle Brigade officers
British Army generals of World War I
Burials at St Mary's Catholic Cemetery, Kensal Green
People educated at Burney's Academy